The 2012 Aegon Pro-Series Loughborough was a professional tennis tournament played on indoor hard courts. It was the third edition of the tournament which was part of the 2012 ATP Challenger Tour and 2012 ITF Women's Circuit. It took place in Loughborough, United Kingdom, on 5–11 November 2012.

Men's singles main-draw entrants

Seeds 

 1 Rankings are as of October 29, 2012.

Other entrants 
The following players received wildcards into the singles main draw:
  Richard Bloomfield
  Dan Evans
  Ashley Hewitt
  James Marsalek

The following players received entry as a special exempt into the singles main draw:
  Henri Laaksonen

The following players received entry from the qualifying draw:
  Tom Burn
  Richard Gabb
  Myles Orton
  Patrik Rosenholm

Champions

Men's singles 

  Evgeny Donskoy def.  Jan-Lennard Struff, 6–2, 4–6, 6–1

Women's singles 

  Renata Voráčová def.  Julia Kimmelmann, 7–5, 6–7(6–8), 6–3

Men's doubles 

  James Cerretani /  Adil Shamasdin def.  Purav Raja /  Divij Sharan, 6–4, 7–5.

Women's doubles 

  Anna Fitzpatrick /  Jade Windley def.  Karen Barbat /  Lara Michel, 6–2, 6–2.

Aegon Pro-Series Loughborough
Aegon Pro-Series Loughborough
Aegon Pro-Series Loughborough
2012 in English tennis